Valeria del Campo Gutiérrez (born 15 February 2000) is a Costa Rican footballer who plays as a centre back for Mexican Liga MX Femenil club CF Monterrey and the Costa Rica women's national team.

International career
Del Campo made her senior debut for Costa Rica on 3 August 2019 against Argentina in the 2019 Pan American Games.

References

External links
 
 
 
 

2000 births
Living people
People from Alajuela
Costa Rican women's footballers
Women's association football central defenders
Deportivo Saprissa players
C.F. Monterrey (women) players
Liga MX Femenil players
Costa Rica women's international footballers
Footballers at the 2019 Pan American Games
Medalists at the 2019 Pan American Games
Pan American Games bronze medalists for Costa Rica
Pan American Games medalists in football
Costa Rican expatriate footballers
Costa Rican expatriate sportspeople in Mexico
Expatriate women's footballers in Mexico